Torbenia larseni, the Larsen's glasswing, is a butterfly in the family Lycaenidae. It is found in southern Nigeria and western Cameroon. The habitat consists of forests. The species was named after Torben Bjørn Larsen.

References

Butterflies described in 1969
Poritiinae